Heleen ("Hellen") Aafje Boering (born July 27, 1964 in Enschede, Overijssel) is a retired water polo goalkeeper from the Netherlands. She made her debut for the Women's National Team in 1984, and was on the squad that won the silver medal at the first official World Championship in women's water polo in 1986 (Madrid, Spain). 

Boering competed for her native country at the 2000 Summer Olympics in Sydney, Australia, finishing in fourth place. Her biggest success came in 1991, when the Dutch won the 1991 World Aquatics Championship, defeating Canada in the final.

See also
 Netherlands women's Olympic water polo team records and statistics
 List of women's Olympic water polo tournament goalkeepers
 List of world champions in women's water polo
 List of World Aquatics Championships medalists in water polo

References

External links
 

1964 births
Living people
Sportspeople from Enschede
Dutch female water polo players
Water polo goalkeepers
Olympic water polo players of the Netherlands
Water polo players at the 2000 Summer Olympics
World Aquatics Championships medalists in water polo